In the Thai League T1, the Thai League Coach of the Year Award is an annual award given to a head coach who is recognised for their overall contribution to the achievements of a specific team.

Winners

External links
 Official Thai Premier League Website

Coach of the Year
Association football in Thailand lists